Liu Fulian (born August 1952) is a retired general (shangjiang) of the Chinese People's Liberation Army (PLA). He served as Political Commissar of People's Liberation Army Strategic Support Force.

Biography
Liu was born in Lai'an County, Anhui province. He joined the People's Liberation Army in 1970, and began work as a clerk. He rose through the ranks serving in mostly political roles, such as political liaison, political instructor, and did not have any known combat experience. In December 2003, Liu became the head of the political department of the 27th Group Army. In December 2006, he was promoted to Political Commissar of the Beijing Garrison. In 2008, he was promoted to the rank of lieutenant general. In December 2009, he was named Political Commissar of the Beijing Military Region. In July 2013 he was promoted to general, the highest non-wartime rank in the PLA. In 2016, he was made the inaugural Political Commissar of People's Liberation Army Strategic Support Force. In 2017, he left his post as political commissar.

Liu was a delegate to the 17th National Congress of the Communist Party of China, and was a member of the 18th Central Committee of the Communist Party of China.

In 2019, Fulian was demoted for bribery.

References

1953 births
Living people
People's Liberation Army generals from Anhui
People from Chuzhou
Political commissars of the Beijing Military Region
Members of the 18th Central Committee of the Chinese Communist Party